Pedarayudu is a 1995 Indian Telugu-language drama film directed by Ravi Raja Pinisetty and starring Mohan Babu in a dual role with Bhanupriya and Soundarya also starred in the film. Tamil Superstar Rajinikanth appears in a special appearance in the film. For his role, Mohan Babu won the Best Actor - Telugu at South Filmfare Awards. This film is a remake of the 1994 Tamil film, Nattamai. The film was recorded an 'industry' hit. It was also Rajini's last proper Telugu film (without its dubbed version, as of 2022).

Plot
Pedarayudu is a kindhearted and disciplined man. He sits on the ancestral throne in his village to do justice. He hears all the cases and gives solutions to the people and punishments to the wrongdoers. His wife Lakshmi admires and respects him. His brothers Raja and Ravindra fear him but also have a lot of respect for him as he has brought them up as his children. Raja marries Bharathi, the daughter of an industrialist. She dislikes Pedarayudu because of his verdicts and attitude and her husband for being so timid with his brother but later transforms after learning of the former's greatness from her father. Ravindra loves his paternal cousin, Bhupathi's daughter.

In the flashback, Paparayudu, Pedarayadu's father, orders Bhupathi to marry his servant's daughter whom he raped, though he is his sister's son. His brother-in-law shoots him as he is disappointed by his verdict. Enraged, Paparayudu gives his final verdict before dying to abandon their family, and whoever visits his house will receive the same punishment and also not to share even a glass of water with them. Paparayudu also tells Pedarayudu "Whenever we give a wrong verdict, that moment it is said that we die." The moment when he says that, he dies.

Bhupathi builds envy on his uncle's family and waits for an opportunity to take revenge on them. He hires a woman as the village school teacher and asks her to make Raja fall for her. She does so to save her father, who is in the hands of Bhupathi. He kills her and makes the villagers believe that Raja has committed the murder. Pedarayudu sentences ten years of exile for his brother's family. Bhupathi learns of his daughter's love and tries to kill Ravindra, with the help of his goons. Raja goes in rescue of him, and a pregnant Bharathi goes to Pedarayudu to convey this message. While Raja starts to take revenge on Bhupathi, Pedarayudu's aunt rushes to Pedarayudu, kills Bhupathi, and reveals the truth and tells that he punished his brother without committing any mistake and also told that the crimes blamed on Raja were really perpetrated by Bhupathi. Pedarayudu dies upon learning that he gave a wrong verdict, and Raja is shown taking his place on the throne.

Cast

 Mohan Babu as Pedarayudu and Raja (dual role)
 Raja Ravindra as Ravindra
 Bhanupriya as Lakshmi
 Soundarya as Bharathi
 Subhashri as Teacher
 Anandaraj as Bhupathi
 Jayanthi as Paparayudu's sister and Pedarayudu's aunt
 Brahmanandam as Dhanush
 Chalapathi Rao as Bhupathi's father
 M. S. Narayana as Acharya
 Babu Mohan as Dhanush's father
 Master Mahendra
 Rajinikanth as Paparayudu (special appearance)
 Kaikala Satyanarayana as Bharathi's father (guest appearance)

Soundtrack

References

External links
 

1990s Telugu-language films
1995 films
Telugu remakes of Tamil films
1990s action films
Films scored by Koti
Films directed by Ravi Raja Pinisetty